The HICOM Handalan (also known as DefTech Handalan) is a truck developed by DRB-HICOM subsidiary, DRB-HICOM Defence Technologies (DefTech) in collaboration with Isuzu in 1996. It based on Isuzu FSS 32G where at the first phase of development DRB-HICOM gained a license to locally assembled Isuzu FSS 32G in Malaysia to replace the 3-ton truck already used by Malaysian Armed Forces.

History

The development of the Handalan continued when DRB-HICOM able to improved the truck performance and replaced some of the Japanese-made components with locally made components thus easier for the user for the maintenance.

Handalan trucks are developed in several versions namely Handalan I, Handalan II and Handalan III where each version received it's owned upgrade and improvement based on latest needs.

Variants

Handalan I
First variant of the truck. Powered by Isuzu 6HE1 diesel engine with 180 hp with 5-speed manual transmission and configured for a 4x4. The production stop in 2003 and replace by the new Handalan II.

Handalan II
Updated model with more powerful engine that generates 195 hp. The manual transmission also replaced with 4-speed automatic gearbox. Handalan II can carry up to 4,800 kg on the road and 3,000 over rough terrain. The other improvement of the Handalan II includes Allison 2500 SP fully automatic transmission and optional equipment offered including automatic chassis grease system, vehicle monitoring system and heavy duty type winch system (5,400kg).

Handalan III
A third generation of Handalan truck revealed in 2012. The truck uses Tata diesel engines that generate more powerful 230 hp.

Operators
 : 6 - Uses by Royal Australian Air Force (RAAF) in RMAF Butterworth.
 : 115 - Uses by Royal Brunei Land Forces (RBLF).
 : 2,260 in service + 414 on order.

References

Military trucks
Military vehicles of Malaysia